The following lists events that happened during 2009 in Slovakia.

Incumbents
President: Ivan Gašparovič
Prime Minister: Robert Fico

Events
 Slovakia in the Eurovision Song Contest 2009

January
 January 1 - Slovakia changes currency, replacing the koruna with the euro.

Predicted and scheduled events
June  - European Parliament election

Unknown Dates
 Presidential election

Deaths

Births

References

 
2000s in Slovakia
Years of the 21st century in Slovakia
Slovakia
Slovakia